The Xi'an–Shiyan high-speed railway is a high-speed railway in China.

History
Construction began on 15 December 2021. It is expected to open in 2026.

Route
When open, this line and the Wuhan–Shiyan high-speed railway will form a complete  line between Wuhan and Xi'an.

Stations

References

High-speed railway lines in China
High-speed railway lines under construction